Jamuna Gurung is a Nepalese footballer. She is the former captain of the Nepalese women's national football team.

With 21 international goals and 35 in the domestic league Gurung is the most successful and prolific Nepalese women's footballer. Coach Kumar Katuwal says "Gurung is a valuable asset to our team. her clinical finishing is our lethal weapon. She is so humble and decent and she understands her job very well. I am very proud to have her captain of the team."

See also
Nepal women's national football team
All Nepal Football Association

References

Living people
People from Morang District
Nepalese women's footballers
Nepal women's international footballers
Nepalese Buddhists
Women's association football forwards
Year of birth missing (living people)
Gurung people